Alucita ochrobasalis is a moth of the family Alucitidae. It was described by Henricus Jacobus Gerardus van Mastrigt and Cees Gielis in 2009. It is found in Papua New Guinea.

References

Moths described in 2009
Alucitidae
Moths of New Guinea